Dubino is a rural locality (a settlement) in Krasnoyaruzhsky District, Belgorod Oblast, Russia. The population was 5 as of 2010. There is one street.

Geography 
Dubino is located 6 km north of Krasnaya Yaruga (the district's administrative centre) by road. Krasnaya Yaruga is the nearest rural locality.

References 

Rural localities in Krasnoyaruzhsky District